Caroline Agnou (born 26 May 1996) is a Swiss athlete who specialises in the heptathlon. She competed at the 2015 World Championships in Beijing, China, finishing 22nd. Earlier that year she won the gold at the 2015 European Junior Championships. Her personal best in heptathlon is 6123 points set in Eskilstuna in  2015. She has a Swiss-German mother and a Beninese father.

Competition record

Personal bests
Outdoor
200 metres – 24.36 (-0.1 m/s) (Bydgoszcz 2017)
800 metres – 2:16.06 (Bydgoszcz 2017)
100 metres hurdles – 13.60 (-0.1 m/s) (Zürich 2017)
High jump – 1.74 (Eskilstuna 2015)
Long jump – 6.36 (+0.3 m/s) (Bydgoszcz 2017)
Shot put – 14.77 (Bydgoszcz 2017)
Javelin throw – 49.34 (Eskilstuna 2015)
Heptathlon – 6330 (Bydgoszcz 2017)

Indoor
800 metres – 2:21.03 (Magglingen 2018)
60 metres hurdles – 8.42 (Magglingen 2018)
High jump – 1.74 (Magglingen 2018)
Long jump – 6.34 (Magglingen 2018)
Shot put – 14.92 (Birmingham 2018)
Pentathlon – 4440 (Magglingen 2018)

References

External links
 

1996 births
Living people
Swiss heptathletes
Swiss sportswomen
World Athletics Championships athletes for Switzerland
People from Biel/Bienne District
Swiss people of Beninese descent
Swiss sportspeople of African descent
Swiss people of German descent
Universiade bronze medalists for Switzerland
Universiade medalists in athletics (track and field)
Medalists at the 2019 Summer Universiade
Sportspeople from the canton of Bern